Philipp Valentin Albrecht Voit von Rieneck (1612–1672) was the Prince-Bishop of Bamberg from 1653 to 1672.

Biography

Philipp Valentin Albrecht Voit von Rieneck was born in Rodenbach, today a part of Lohr, on 10 January 1612.

He was appointed Prince-Bishop of Bamberg on 13 February 1653 but this appointment was not confirmed by Pope Alexander VII until 14 January 1658.  He was consecrated as a bishop in 1661.

He died in Bamberg on 3 February 1672.

References

1612 births
1672 deaths
Prince-Bishops of Bamberg